Rossel may refer to:

People 

 Eduard Rossel (born 1937), Russian politician in Sverdlovsk oblast
 Louis Rossel (1844–1871), French army officer and Minister of War during the 1871 Paris Commune
 Marie-Thérèse Rossel (1910–1987), Belgian newspaper editor and businesswoman, proprietor of Rossel & Cie from 1935 to 1987
 Martin Rössel (born 1959), Swedish musician and producer
 Ricardo Rossel (1841–1909), Peruvian writer and poet.

Places 

 Rößel, the former German name for Reszel, a city in Poland
 Rossel (Elbe), a river in Germany
 Rossel Island (Yela), the easternmost island in the Louisiade Archipelago of Papua New Guinea

Other 

 Rossel & Cie, Belgian media group

German-language surnames